Gorynychus is a genus of therocephalian from the mid-Permian from Kotelnich, Russia. The genus contains two species, G. masyutinae and G. sundyrensis. It was named after the three-headed dragon Zmey Gorynych (Змей Горыныч) from Russian mythology.

Description
 
G. masyutinae, only known from its holotype, was wolf-sized and appears to have represented the largest predator in the Kotelnich fauna. Like many theriodonts, it had strongly developed and prominent canine teeth.

Paleoecology
The discovery of such a large therocephalian as the apex predator of its environment coupled with the discovery of a smaller gorgonopsid, the smaller and nocturnal Nochnitsa, in the same formation indicates that a faunal turnover was occurring at the time, with gorgonopsians taking over the therocephalians' role as the dominant predators in their environment.

References

Fossil taxa described in 2018
Permian animals
Therocephalia genera